Lyubov Sokolova may refer to:

Lyubov Sergeyevna Sokolova, Soviet actress
Lyubov Vladimirovna Sokolova, Russian volleyball player